Luigi Canotto (born 19 May 1994) is an Italian professional footballer who plays as a forward for  club Reggina, on loan from Frosinone.

Club career
He made his professional debut in the Lega Pro for Südtirol on 11 October 2014 in a game against Renate.

On 28 August 2020 he became a new Chievo player.

On 4 August 2021, he signed a three-year contract with Frosinone.

On 25 July 2022, Canotto moved to Reggina on loan with a conditional obligation to buy.

References

External links
 

1994 births
Sportspeople from the Province of Cosenza
Living people
Italian footballers
U.S. Salernitana 1919 players
A.S.D. Sorrento players
U.S. Agropoli 1921 players
F.C. Südtirol players
Serie C players
A.S. Melfi players
Trapani Calcio players
S.S. Juve Stabia players
A.C. ChievoVerona players
Frosinone Calcio players
Reggina 1914 players
Serie B players
Serie D players
Italy youth international footballers
Association football forwards
Footballers from Calabria